Graciella pulchella is a species of beetle in the family Cerambycidae. It was described by Johann Christoph Friedrich Klug in 1835, originally under the genus Saperda. It has a wide distribution in Africa. It feeds on Theobroma cacao.

References

Tragocephalini
Beetles described in 1835